Joon Park (also known as JP Novark, Korean:박준언, born November 19, 1989, in Daejeon, South Korea) is a Korean-American pop surrealist painter and an experienced trompe-l'œil artist. He is currently located in the Bay Area.

References

External links
Official Site
Turning Art

1989 births
American artists of Korean descent
21st-century American painters
Painters from California
American contemporary painters
People from Placer County, California
Living people
American male painters